Balu Varghese is an Indian actor and singer who predominantly works in the Malayalam film industry. He began his acting career as a child actor in Chanthupottu (2005).

Early life and Career
Balu Varghese was born in Kochi . He is the son of E. J. Varghese and Neena Varghese. He is also the nephew of Malayalam actor Lal and Music Director Alex Paul. He made his acting debut in 2005, by playing a child artist in Chanthupottu. He later starred in Lal Jr.’s directorial debut film Honey Bee.

Filmography

All films are in Malayalam language unless otherwise noted.

Personal life

He married Aileena Catherin Amon on 02 February 2020. The couple were blessed with a baby boy named Ezekiel Amy Varghese on March 31, 2021

References 

Male actors from Kochi
Male actors in Malayalam cinema
Indian male film actors
1991 births
Living people
21st-century Indian male actors